The Norn Stones are fictional powerful magical items appearing in American comic books published by Marvel Comics. The Stones are depicted as being from Asgard, and are featured in the Marvel Universe.

Fictional history
Karnilla once sent Loki some magic from the Norn stones.
 
Some time later, Morgan le Fay used the power of the Norn Stones and the Twilight Sword to restructure reality.
 
During the Dark Reign storyline, Loki wanted to use the Hood as an instrument in Norman Osborn's collapse, and takes the Hood and Madame Masque to Cuba and presents the Norn Stones to him, which gives the Hood a new power source. The Hood later reveals the Norn Stones to his Crime Syndicate and empowers them with the ability to find and kill the New Avengers. As Donyell Taylor and Tigra attack the Hood, he uses the Norn Stones to empower some of the cadets on his side.
 
During the Siege of Asgard, Tyr is seriously wounded by the Hood using the Norn stones. As the Void tore apart the New Avengers, Young Avengers and Secret Warriors, Loki began to repent, realizing that what had happened to Asgard was not what he wanted. He begged his father Odin to return to him the Norn Stones, which were taken away from the Hood and given to Loki. This deprived the Hood of all power, and Loki used this power, and the power the Hood had given to his gang, to revive the mortal and immortal heroes struck down by the Void and empower them to defeat the Sentry (fully possessed by the Void).

Other versions

Ultimate Marvel
The Ultimate Marvel version of Norn Stones are extensions of Odin's power. Loki decides to betray Asgard and steals the Norn Stones, killing Balder when he tries to interfere before fleeing Asgard. During World War II, Baron Zemo approaches Heinrich Himmler and asks for an army to invade Asgard. While Himmler is skeptical at first, Zemo shows him that he possesses the mythical Norn Stones. Himmler immediately approves Zemo's plan. Zemo then uses the stones to summon the Frost Giants, and the combined German and Frost Giant forces attack Asgard. Zemo then reveals himself to be Loki, finally making his move on his former home. The Asgardians are taken by surprise and slaughtered, leaving only Odin and Thor left. In anger, Odin pushes Loki into the World Tree, where he is locked in the Room With No Doors. In the modern era, in Germany, an old German veteran from World War II follows instructions given to him by Loki and uses the Norn Stones to free him from the Room With No Doors, for which Loki shows how he is thankful by killing him.

In other media

Television
 The Norn Stones appear in The Avengers: Earth's Mightiest Heroes. In the episode "This Hostage Earth", the Masters of Evil steal them from Karnilla so they can use them to fuse Earth with Asgard. In "The Fall of Asgard", the Avengers destroy most of the Norn Stones, which scatters them across several realms connected to Yggdrasil. In "Acts of Vengeance", Baron Zemo attempts to use the last Norn Stone to protect himself from the Enchantress' wrath, but she and Wonder Man disappear after attempting to claim it.
 A Norn Stone appears in the Ultimate Spider-Man episode "Itsy Bitsy Spider-Man". Loki uses it to turn Spider-Man, his fellow S.H.I.E.L.D. trainees, and Thor into children so he can become Odin's heir. However, he is eventually foiled by the heroes.

Video games
 Norn stones appear as a gear item in Marvel's Avengers.

References